The 1995 FIBA Under-19 World Championship (Greek: 1995 Παγκόσμιο Πρωτάθλημα FIBA Under-19) was the 5th edition of the FIBA U19 World Championship. It was held in multiple cities in Greece, from 12 to 22 July 1995. Host country Greece, won their first (and only, as of 2021), championship in the tournament, after going undefeated and beating Australia, 91-73 in the Gold Medal Game. Spain notched their first-ever podium finish, after defeating Croatia 77-64 in the Bronze Medal Game. Efthimios Rentzias of Greece, was named the tournament MVP.

Venues

Qualified teams

Preliminary round

Group A

Group B

Group C

Group D

Quarterfinal round

Group E

Group F

Group G

Group H

Classification 13th–16th

Source: FIBA Archive

Semifinals

15th place

13th place

Classification 9th–12th

Source: FIBA Archive

Semifinals

11th place

9th place

Classification 5th–8th

Source: FIBA Archive

Semifinals

7th place

5th place

Final round

Source: 
FIBA Archive

Semifinals

3rd place

Final

Final standings

Source: FIBA Archive

Awards

References

External links
 FIBA Basketball Archive

1995
1995 in basketball
International youth basketball competitions hosted by Greece
1995–96 in Greek basketball
July 1995 sports events in Europe